Michael Heinz Kaufmann (born 21 April 1964) is a German politician from the AfD. He has been Member of the German Bundestag for Saalfeld-Rudolstadt – Saale-Holzland-Kreis – Saale-Orla-Kreis since 2021.

Early life 
Kaufmann was born in Jena.

Political career 
He defeated CDU incumbent Albert Weiler in 2021.

References

See also 

 List of members of the 20th Bundestag

1964 births
Living people
Members of the Bundestag for the Alternative for Germany

21st-century German politicians
Members of the Bundestag for Thuringia
Members of the Landtag of Thuringia
Members of the Bundestag 2021–2025
People from Jena